A. frontalis may refer to:

 Amphisbaena frontalis, Vanzolini, 1991, a worm lizard species in the genus Amphisbaena
 Anarhynchus frontalis, the wrybill, a species of plover endemic to New Zealand
 Aranea frontalis, a synonym for Evarcha arcuata, a jumping spider species
 Atelerix frontalis, the Southern African hedgehog, a species of mammal found in Angola and Botswana
 Avatha frontalis, a synonym for Avatha discolor, a moth species
 The frontal artery, arteria frontalis, a branch of the ophthalmic artery.

See also
 Frontalis (disambiguation)